Chakeri (also Romanized as Chākerī) is a village in Fathabad Rural District, in the Central District of Khatam County, Yazd Province, Iran. At the 2006 census, its population was 211, in 54 families.

References 

Populated places in Khatam County